American National Bank Building may refer to one of the following historic structures:

In the United States

 American National Bank Building (Alamosa, Colorado)
 American National Bank Building (Pensacola, Florida)
 American National Bank Building (Sarasota, Florida)
 American National Bank Building (West Palm Beach, Florida)
 American National Bank (Camden, New Jersey), listed on the NRHP in New Jersey
 Federal-American National Bank (Washington, D.C.), listed on the NRHP in Washington, D.C.